Potentilla caulescens, also known as the short-stemmed cinquefoil, is a perennial herbaceous species of flowering plant in the rose family, Rosaceae.

Distribution
It is native to Europe, where it is found throughout the Alps as well as mountains in southern Europe and the Atlas Mountains in northern Africa. It grows in rocky terrain, often in crevices from elevations of 500 to 2000 meters.

Description
The plant measures between 10 and 30 centimeters with woody stems. It flowers from June to September, with flowers 1 to 2.2 centimeters across.

References 

caulescens
Potentilla caulescens
Plants described in 1756
Taxa named by Carl Linnaeus